The Palestinian National Alliance was an alliance of Palestinian movements, founded in 1983. The Alliance consisted of the PFLP-GC, as-Saiqa, Palestinian Popular Struggle Front, Fatah al-Intifada, the Palestinian Liberation Front (Mohammad Miqdah wing) and the Palestinian Revolutionary Communist Party. The Alliance was dissolved in 1985, as the Palestinian National Salvation Front was formed.

References

1983 establishments in the Palestinian territories
1985 disestablishments in the Israeli Civil Administration area
Defunct political party alliances in the Palestinian territories
Organizations associated with the Ba'ath Party
Palestine Liberation Organization